Microdesmia is a genus of flowering plants belonging to the family Chrysobalanaceae.

Its native range is Mexico to Southern Tropical America.

Species:

Microdesmia arborea 
Microdesmia rigida

References

Chrysobalanaceae
Chrysobalanaceae genera